Conceptus Inc. was an American medical products manufacturer and developer.  It is now a fully owned subsidiary of Bayer AG of Germany.

Founded in 1992, the corporation is headquartered in Mountain View, California.  The company began development of micro-catheter and guidewire systems that allowed physicians to access and navigate the fallopian tubes using a non-incisional approach. While this technology was first used in products to diagnose or treat infertility, in 1998, the company focused on the design, development, and clinical testing of Essure, a non-incisional alternative to tubal ligation.

Essure showed promise by eliminating the cutting, clipping, and burning associated with tubal ligation.  After clinical testing, Conceptus began marketing Essure commercially in Australia, Singapore, Europe, and Canada. In 2002, the US Food and Drug Administration approved the use of Essure in the United States.

On April 29, 2013, Bayer AG made a cash offer of $31.00 per share for Conceptus, a 20% premium to the company's stock market price, valuing it at $1.1bn. The deal completed and closed on June 5, 2013.

References

External links 
 
Official website for Essure

Bayer
Health care companies established in 1992
Health care companies based in California
Companies based in Mountain View, California
Companies formerly listed on the Nasdaq
Health care companies disestablished in 2013
2013 disestablishments in California
2013 mergers and acquisitions